Hijrat is a 2016 Pakistani romantic film directed by Farouq Mengal and produced by FM Productions, and starring Asad Zaman Khan and Rabia Butt. The plot revolves around people affected by the Afghan War.

The film was distributed by Hum Films and Eveready Pictures, and released on 22 April 2016 in cinemas across Pakistan. Its premier held at The Place, Nuplex Cinema, Karachi, Pakistan. The film opened with average reviews from critics and was declared a flop at the box-office.

Cast
 Asad Zaman Khan as Murad
 Rabia Butt as Jia (Protagonist)
 Nadeem Baig as Dr. Sameer
 Salma Agha as Feriha
 Durdana Butt as Nani
 Azra Aftab as Mehwish
 Ayub Khoso
 Rubab Ali as Mahi
 Momina Iqbal as Investigation officer
 Fahd Nur
 Zaib Rehman
 Jamal Shah
 Sana Nawaz (special appearance in song ''Chali Re Chali'')

Filming
The film has shot its first spell in Quetta, shooting continued in Europe in spring of 2014 (Istanbul, Turkey). The film-making equipment has been imported from India. Farouq Mengal used all his mastery and filmed some of the best shots never practiced in Pakistani Films. Exotic locations of Quetta, Nashukai and Istanbul can be seen. Hijrat was filmed on 35 mm Camera and equipment has shown its class.

Music

The music has been composed by Sahir Ali Bagga and film will include songs by Ali Azmat, Rahat Fateh Ali Khan, Omer Nadeem, Sara Raza Khan, Imran Aziz, Abida Parveen, and Nandini Srikar. Nandini Srikar (an Indian singer) sang an item song (Chali Re Chali) for this movie.

Release

Box office 
The film failed to recover its budget, grossing only Rs. 6 million across cinemas in Pakistan over the course of one week. It ran for maximum two to three weeks in cinemas of Pakistan. In response to its theatrical failure, an official of Hum Films told The Express Tribune, ''We never expected it to do this badly in cinemas. It was always going to be tough but it is very hard to point out what exactly went wrong.''

See also
 List of Pakistani films of 2016

References

External links
 
 
 

2010s Urdu-language films
Lollywood films
2016 films
Afghanistan–Pakistan relations in popular culture
Films shot in Balochistan, Pakistan
Films scored by Sahir Ali Bagga
Pakistani romantic thriller films
2010s romantic thriller films
Films shot in Istanbul